Farzad Majidi (born September 9, 1977 in Tehran, Iran) is a former Iranian football player. He usually played in the midfield position. He is the younger brother of fellow footballer Farhad Majidi.

Club career

Honors
Esteghlal:

Iran's Premier Football League Winner:1
2005/06

External links
 Roster Farzad Majidi
Farzad Majidi on Instagram

Living people
1977 births
Iranian footballers
Esteghlal F.C. players
Steel Azin F.C. players
PAS Hamedan F.C. players
Gostaresh Foulad F.C. players
payam Mashhad players
Iran international footballers
2004 AFC Asian Cup players
Association football midfielders
People from Qaem Shahr
Sportspeople from Mazandaran province